Princess Agents is a 2017 Chinese television series based on the novel 11 Chu Te Gong Huang Fei (11处特工皇妃) written by Xiao Xiang Dong Er (潇湘冬儿). It stars Zhao Liying, Lin Gengxin, Shawn Dou and Li Qin.
The series aired on Hunan TV from 5 June to 1 August 2017.

The story is unfinished and ends on a cliffhanger in the final episode. No sequel has been confirmed.
Princess Agents is a commercial success, more than 40 million views on Chinese streaming sites Youku, Tencent, and iQiyi.

Plot
The story takes place during the chaotic times of Northern Wei, where innocent citizens are often kidnapped and subjected to a bloody struggle for power. The slave Chu Qiao is thrown into a forest along with other slaves and becomes the next hunting target of the rich lords. Upon seeing this, Chu Qiao swears to flee from that place with her younger sisters, however when she draws the attention of the Master Yuwen Yue, Chu Qiao begins a strict training without realizing that they begin to fall in love while training together, he also meets Yan Xun who builds a sense of camaraderie indicating that he resembles him in terms of personality and behavior.

On the way Chu Qiao meets the cheerful Prince Wei, Yuan Song and the rebellious Prince Liang, Xiao Ce who fall in love with Chu Qiao to which she ignores him but more his trusted best friend is Xiao Ce and a princess spy named Xiao Yu, but she meets other princes like Yuwen Huai, Zhao Xifeng and Wei Shu You who hate her, but Yuwen Yue is the one who protects her the most, being Chu Qiao's great love. Yan Xun, the noble Prince Yan, has Yuan Chun as his best friend, they both have a beautiful friendship, they share affection, kindness and laughter, he cares for and trusts her since childhood, they get along well and understand each other, showing mutual loyalty.

Yan Xun, the noble Prince Yan, has Yuan Chun, his best friend. They both have a nice friendship, share love, kindness and laughter; he cares for and trusts her since childhood, they get along well and understand each other, showing mutual loyalty.

But when the nobles of Western Wei create intrigues and falsely accuse the Northern Yan family of stealing the military map and revealing it to the Emperor of Wei when really everything was planned by Yuwen Huai and Wei Shu You. The emperor commands the princes of Yuwen Manor to kill every relative of Yan Xun's family who are marked as traitors. After the incident Yan Xun and Chu Qiao are imprisoned, Yan Xun's attitude changed and he became an ambitious, cold and cruel person, he vowed to take revenge by killing each of Western Wei and Yuwen Manor for his family with Chu's support. Qiao, Zhong Yu, and their army, but Yan Xun is spared by the emperor.

On the other hand, Yan Xun still has esteem for Yuan Chun, she is hurt by what happened, so Yan Xun does not blame him until the emperor sees them together, decides to marry them and send them both back to North Yan, without realizing it. that it was all an armed plan to finish off Yan Xun, so he agrees to marry Yuan Chun, but when the day of his wedding arrived, the emperor sent one of his armies to kill behind his back, Yan Xun, realizing, reveals and decided to flee with his army, Yuan Chun upon learning what happened begs his father the emperor refusing to marry to let Yan Xun go to which she decides to go after him. On the way, Yan Xun meets Yuan Chun, feeling guilty, begs, humiliating herself in front of him, telling him that he wants her to live, it is her only desire, to which Yan Xun is affected, seeing her suffering and pain, tells her that with her it is not the fight, that it is not he is worthy of his love because he is his father's enemy, he flees thus cutting off their friendship.

Yan Xun becomes king and begins to doubt Chu Qiao's loyalty and disappoints her on different occasions by casting aside their close friendship while making too many sacrifices to achieve the power of his ambition, Chu Qiao walks away and secretly meets with Yuwen Yue getting closer both growing their love until they had their first kiss when they were fighting in the room, Yan Xun suspicious of Chu Qiao that he expels from his army and uses it to finish off Yuwen Yue the last Yuwen Manor, Chu Qiao disappointed by him The man I once trusted breaks his friendship with Yan Xun and decides to fight together with Yuwen Yue to destroy Yan Xun's plans for revenge.

Yan Xun due to so much pressure in the fight and his desire for revenge begins to feel bad for what one of his guards recommends that he be checked, which he accepts, being already in his quarters the doctor comes to check him without realizing that it was Yuan Chun in disguise With the plan to finish off Yan Xun, by letting him pass, Yuan Chun, covering his face, checks him to which Yan Xun calls his attention by his voice and his face to which she explains that it was because of the fire, changing the subject. recommends doing acupuncture for the pain in her body but when she takes it out she has a hidden weapon, but not before being interrupted by Yan Xun asking her to give him massages since she heard that she is good at doing it, she accepts his request while they both begin To practice, Yuan Chun puts on a false identity so as not to be discovered at the same time, also telling about the Western Wei where they lived and remembering their childhoods, for Yan Xun it was prosperous telling him that in the way he speaks and his body or it comes from Chang'an, but for Yuan Chun it was sad because he lost everything, Yan Xun without knowing the reason tells him because the sudden change makes him sad without waiting for more Yuan Chun with so much hatred already wanting revenge for having daring to harm his brother, for not having fulfilled his promise to take care of her and send his army to take away her honor and hurt her.

Yuan Chun asks for permission to apply the fine needles while he remains resting, he takes out the weapon, taking advantage of it and points it to stab him, but one of the servants sees him and screams, to which Yan Xun reacts by taking out his sword and removes his mask, When she was discovered, Yan Xun was immediately surprised, his army stopped him, but he decided not to hurt her, asking them to leave alone. Yan Xun, seeing her, was amazed to see her change, being an older woman but at the same time sad, Yuan Chun without saying nothing about it or seeing him, to which Yan Xun tells him to retire but not before asking him for forgiveness for the damage he caused him and to take care of himself, with her back turned, it is the last time he sees him and he hears him shedding tears in the eyes, leaving Yan Xun moved to see her so he sends his army back to Yuan Chun.

On the other hand, Chu Qiao meets Yuwen Yue in the frozen lake having both practiced and she for thanking him, not knowing how to pay him for the risks he took, which leaves him sad, after Yuwen Yue being at home remembers her, leaving him devastated. Suddenly they tell him that Yan Xun is organizing a battle, so he asks them to prepare their troops for the fight. Chu Qiao, being with the Xiulu troop, prepares to fight, knowing that Yan Xun has been planning it, but not before going to the mansion. from Yuwen Manor to see him while he was accompanied by his army, they ask him to withdraw, both begin to practice eating and drinking at the same time, saying that in battle they will be enemies and that they can kill each other, until Chu Qiao tells him If he lives, he asks if he will be married with children, Yuwen Yue tells him the same thing before separating.

Yan Xun in his chambers gives the order to finish off Yuwen Yue before the battle when he finds out that Chu Qiao is siding with him, so he sets off, on the other hand, the prince Yuan Che Xiang, Yuan Song's older brother and Yuan Chun, going to stop Yan Xun on the way, Yuan Song prevents him along with his companion asking him not to go because he may die and he does not want to lose his brother, but Prince Xiang refuses and continues on his way, even so Yuan Song does not He withdraws, begging him not to leave his older brother in doubt. In another way, Chu Qiao heads to North Yan together with the Xiulu troop, sensing that Yan Xun's goal is to kill off Yuwen Yue and he has nothing to do with her. since he only used it to find him, which is why he changed Chu Qiao's decision and separated from his troops taking different paths in passing, he meets Yan Xun, Chu Qiao complains to him, telling him why he goes ahead before the battle, for which Yan Xun is the king of the North Yan cons She sees Yuwen Yue as an intruder and wants to finish off the last of the Yuwen Manor, a furious Chu Qiao does not agree with the plans that Yan Xun took to which she tells him that he and North Yan are worthless to her that in her heart is Yuwen Yue.

So Yan Xun asks Chu Qiao to make it clear if she ever loved him, she tells him that she was worried about him when he was mistreated and was unconscious, she even helped kill the princes that wiped out his family, she made efforts to Returning home, she took her dream as part of her, giving Yan Xun to understand that she only esteemed him as a friend, which is why Chu Qiao showed no interest in him, even though she knows who she loves is Yuwen Yue, Chu Qiao warns Yan Xun that if Yuwen Yue dies in the North, Yan will never forgive him and they will be enemies at the end. Chu Qiao searches for Yuwen Yue, while Yan Xun turned cold upon learning the truth.

In the North Yan Yuwen Yue being in the frozen lake along with half of his army that the rest are fighting in the forest with Yan Xun's comrades, they are injured leaving Yuwen Yue alone in the fight facing everyone even with the officer who manages to injure him by overestimating him but he manages to stab him killing him, while Yan Xun sees Yuwen Yue taking resistance without surrendering, gives the order to kill him, on the other hand Chu Qiao kills Yan Xun's officer and seeing one of his Yuwen Yue troops he asks him to save him, abandoning his xiulu army against Yan Xun's, Chu Qiao goes after Yuwen Yue to save him having a bow and arrows while there he kills everyone, letting Yan Xun shoot an arrow behind him, piercing Yuwen Yue leaving a horrified Chu Qiao goes after him regretting for having abandoned him, crying, she believes that she can die so she shows her love by giving him a kiss on his forehead and giving him strength, Yan Xun seeing their love together of both and his betrayal of Chu Qiao infuriates him, he realizes that everything was in vain, he was wrong, so he got fed up and sent his army again to kill them both without showing mercy.

Chu Qiao looks at him with contempt, becoming his enemy, takes Yuwen Yue's sword, killing everyone, while the lake splits and sees Yuwen Yue fainted almost dead, Yan Xun's soldiers shoot an arrow that they hook to the ice, pulling Chu Qiao away from him. Yuwen Yue, Chu Qiao screaming and crying runs towards him as he sinks, she follows him to the death and jumps to rescue him, inside the lake she swims where Yuwen Yue is and he sees when the Kung Fu force of Yuwen Yue is activated. ice that the higanbana is drawing on Chu Qiao's left shoulder, until he arrives where Yuwen Yue mentally tells him that he must live, to stay alive, she replies that she will come with him, she wants to be by his side, she will not leave, When Chu Qiao kisses him on the forehead, Yuwen Yue pushes her because she knows that she is going to increase her ice Kung Fu power, so she decides to separate, she calls him in pain and tries to hold him but he falls to the bottom of the lake, from there she he remains meditating and the higanbana is drawn like Fully on her back manifesting, opening her eyes bursts her power staring, Chu Qiao becomes the mistress of the wind and cloud decree.

Cast

Main

Supporting

Yuwen Manor

Western Wei

Northern Yan

Southern Liang

Han Shan alliance

Xian Yang

Chu Qiao's family

Xiu Li Army

Bahatu

Production
The series is directed by Wu Jinyuan (Chinese Paladin, Beauty's Rival in Palace, Scarlet Heart). The script is written by Yang Tao and Chen Lan, and reportedly took two years to be completed. Huang Wen (Tiny Times) acts as the style director, while Li Cai (Painted Skin: The Resurrection) serves as the stunt coordinator. The original soundtrack is composed by Roc Chen who worked on the soundtracks of Kungfu Panda 3.

Principal photography began on May 30, 2016,  at Hengdian Studios, and wrapped up on November 21, 2016. Zhao reportedly lost 8 kg for her role. The filming set was opened to fans and the media for viewing in August.

Soundtrack

Reception
On June 26, the drama reached a rating of 2.01% with an audience share of 14.88% according to National Average ratings. This broke the record for a drama airing on a non-primetime timeslot on a non-holiday weekday. The series is also the first Chinese drama to break 40 billion views while still airing. It is also popular in overseas countries, Princess Agents received praise for its unique storyline and stellar performance of the actors, as well as the complex twist and  picturesque landscapes.

Despite its success and initial positive reviews, the series was later criticized for various issues in regards to its production quality – such as its inappropriate use of photoshop/green screen, excessively bright palette and the inconsistent dubbing of actors. The writing was lambasted for several reasons – such as making the female character another "Mary Sue" underneath a strong and independent facade; and including unnecessary story-lines and screen-time for unimportant supporting characters; which makes the plot inconsistent and draggy. Additionally, there was controversy about the excessive amount of focus on the second male lead's storyline, with some viewers sarcastically calling the drama "Yan Xun's revenge story". The drama was also criticized for ending in a cliffhanger.

Ratings

 A week before the drama finished airing, Hunan changed its airing schedule to Sunday-Tuesday at 23:00 CST to promote their upcoming drama during Princess Agents' timeslot. This greatly impacted ratings due to audience not knowing of the new time slot and the drama airing an hour later than usual.

Awards and nominations

Plagiarism allegations
The source novel 11 Chu Te Gong Huang Fei (11处特工皇妃) was alleged to be plagiarized from several novels including Novoland: Pearl Eclipse (斛珠夫人) by Xiao Ruqin, Novoland: Eagle Flag (九州缥缈录) by Jiang Nan and Kun Lun (昆仑) by Feng Ge etc. In August 2015, the author Xia Xiang Dong'er admitted the allegations of plagiarism. In her announcement, she promised to provide a "clean" version in which all the plagiarized parts would be deleted so that the adapted TV series would not infringe the copyrights of the original authors.
When the TV series was first released in June 2017, the original authors still alleged that the TV series contained plots and lines plagiarized from their works. Xiao Ruqin, the author of Novoland:Pearl Eclipse (斛珠夫人), posted on Weibo that she would be taking legal actions to protect their copyrighted works.

International broadcast

References

External links
 

Chinese historical television series
Chinese action television series
Television shows based on Chinese novels
Hunan Television dramas
2017 Chinese television series debuts
Television series by Croton Media
Television series by Ciwen Media